Nuffara (Maltese: In-Nuffara) is an archeological site in Xaghra, Gozo, Malta. The site itself is located on a plateau close to the Ġgantija site. Although most of the remains have eroded, some grain storage pits can still be seen by visitors. A storage pit was cleared in 1961, producing a large amount of sherds. The site is believed to have been a major village used during 1500BCE to 700BCE.

References 

Archeological sites in Malta
Xagħra
Gozo